Sammy Winder (born July 15, 1959) is an American former professional football player who was a running back in the National Football League (NFL), spending his entire career with the Denver Broncos from 1982 to 1990. The son of a farmer, Winder played his high school football at Madison-Ridgeland High School in his hometown of Madison, Mississippi. Winder later played his collegiate football at The University of Southern Mississippi.

College career

Winder played for Southern Mississippi from 1978 to 1981, rushing for 3,114 yards and 39 touchdowns, both school records.  He also caught 11 passes for 70 yards.  In his junior season, he rushed for 996 yards and a nation-leading 20 touchdowns.  As a senior, he rushed for a career-high 1,029 yards and 12 more scores.

Winder's teammates at Southern Mississippi included future NFL players Reggie Collier and Louis Lipps.  In his final two seasons, the team won 9 games each year and went 1-1 in bowl games.

Professional career
Winder was a two-time Pro Bowl selection (1984 and 1986), and was a key reason the Broncos appeared in three Super Bowls in the 1980s (falling to the New York Giants, Washington Redskins and San Francisco 49ers).  In his 9 seasons, Winder rushed for 5,427 yards and 39 touchdowns, while also catching 197 passes for 1,302 yards and 9 touchdowns.  He was known for a signature touchdown celebration he called the 'Mississippi Mud Walk'. During his final two seasons, Winder was demoted to the second running back on the depth chart behind Bobby Humphrey, the Broncos 1989 supplemental draft pick out of the University of Alabama.

After NFL career
Winder is now in the construction business.  He owns and runs his own company, Winder Construction, which he started while still playing for the Denver Broncos in 1987.

See also
 List of NCAA major college football yearly scoring leaders

References

1959 births
Living people
American football running backs
Denver Broncos players
Southern Miss Golden Eagles football players
American Conference Pro Bowl players
People from Madison, Mississippi
Players of American football from Mississippi
African-American players of American football
21st-century African-American people
20th-century African-American sportspeople